Pon Holdings BV is a Dutch conglomerate in the transport sector. It was founded in 1980 by  Ben Pon, Jr., a former racing car driver and son of  Ben Pon, Sr., who became the importer of Volkswagen in the Netherlands in 1947.   it is still owned by the Pon family.

It is one of the five largest bicycle manufacturers in the world, and owns bicycle brands Caloi, Cannondale, Cervélo, Derby Cycle (owner of Focus), GT, Gazelle, IronHorse,  Kalkhoff, Mongoose, Santa Cruz, Veloretti and Schwinn, among others.

Activities

Automotive 
Pon Holdings operates in the automotive and transport sectors through many subsidiaries, involved in activities, such as:
Distribution of consumer automotive brands in the Netherlands: Volkswagen, Audi, SEAT, Škoda, Lamborghini, Bentley, Bugatti and Porsche
Distribution of commercial vehicles in the Netherlands: MAN, Caterpillar and Motrac
Importer of Continental products
Operator of several garages
Owner of Reifen Gundlach, Summa Tyre and Euro-Tyre
Car leasing, such as Dutchlease

Cycling 

Pon owns Cervélo, Derby Cycle (owner of Focus Bikes,), Dorel Sports (parent company of Cannondale, Schwinn, GT Bicycles, Mongoose, Caloi, and IronHorse), Gazelle, Kalkhoff, Union, Santa Cruz Bicycles, Swapfiets, Veloretti, and others.

History 
1986: Takeover importership of SEAT
1988: Takeover of Transmark Groep, Motrac (Linde)
1992: Takeover importership of Škoda
1995: Founding of BelCompany in cooperation with Macintosh Retail Group
1998: Founding of Pon North America
2003: Takeover of Geveke N.V., Founding of Pon Equipment & Power Systems
2005: Founding of Pon Logistic Solutions, Shanghai, China
2011: Takeover of Gazelle
2011: Takeover importership of Cervélo.
2013: Acquisition of Callidus Group 
2015: Takeover of Imtech Marine
2019: Acquisition of Urban Arrow
2021: Acquisition of Mike's Bikes (a 12 store San Francisco Bay Area bicycle retailer)
2021: Acquisition of Dorel Sports
2022: Takeover of Veloretti https://www.veloretti.com/nl/page-journal-pon-bikes

Pre-dating Pon Holding
In 1895 Mijndert Pon, father of Ben Pon (senior) operated a vehicle repairshop. His sons Ben and Wijnand took ownership of the company.
1931: Founding of Pon's Automobielhandel (by then a chain of car dealerships) by Ben and his brother Wijnand Pon
1936: importership Continental AG and Federal
1947: importership Volkswagen 
1948: importership Porsche

External links

References 

Companies based in Flevoland